José Ramos (born 21 April 1899 - deceased) was a Portuguese footballer who played as a forward.

External links 
 
 

1899 births
Portuguese footballers
Association football forwards
C.S. Marítimo players
Portugal international footballers
Year of death missing